Scenery or theatrical scenery is anything used as a setting for a theatrical production.

Scenery may also refer to:
 Mount Scenery, a volcano in the Caribbean Netherlands
 Scenery (Ryo Fukui album) (1976)
 Scenery (Emily King album)
 "Scenery", a song by Neil Young from Mirror Ball

See also 
 Scene (disambiguation)